The following are the events in professional sumo during 1992.

Tournaments

Hatsu basho
Ryōgoku Kokugikan, Tokyo, 12 January – 26 January
{| class="wikitable"
! colspan="17" |1992 Hatsu basho results - Makuuchi Division
|-
! colspan="5" |Result
! colspan="3" |East
!Rank
! colspan="3" |West
! colspan="5" |Result
|-
|align=center|0
|align=center|-
|align=center|0
|align=center|-
|align=center|15
|align=center|ø
|align=center|
|Hokutoumi
|align=center|Y
|align=center|ø
|align=center|
|Asahifuji
|align=center|0
|align=center|-
|align=center|4
|align=center|-
|align=center|11
|-

|align=center|12
|align=center|-
|align=center|3
|align=center|-
|align=center|0
|align=center|
|align=center|
|Konishiki
|align=center|O
|align=center|
|align=center|
|Kirishima
|align=center|8
|align=center|-
|align=center|7
|align=center|-
|align=center|0
|-
|align=center|7
|align=center|-
|align=center|8
|align=center|-
|align=center|0
|align=center|
|align=center|
|Kotonishiki
|align=center|S
|align=center|
|align=center|
|Takatōriki
|align=center|7
|align=center|-
|align=center|8
|align=center|-
|align=center|0
|-
|align=center|8
|align=center|-
|align=center|7
|align=center|-
|align=center|0
|align=center|
|align=center|
|Tochinowaka
|align=center|K
|align=center|
|align=center|
|Akebono
|align=center|13
|align=center|-
|align=center|2
|align=center|-
|align=center|0
|-
|align=center|8
|align=center|-
|align=center|7
|align=center|-
|align=center|0
|align=center|
|align=center|
|Mitoizumi
|align=center|M1
|align=center|
|align=center|
|Wakahanada
|align=center|10
|align=center|-
|align=center|5
|align=center|-
|align=center|0
|-
|align=center|14
|align=center|-
|align=center|1
|align=center|-
|align=center|0
|align=center|
|align=center|
|style="background: PaleGreen;"|Takahanada
|align=center|M2
|align=center|
|align=center|
|Daishōyama
|align=center|5
|align=center|-
|align=center|10
|align=center|-
|align=center|0
|-
|align=center|9
|align=center|-
|align=center|6
|align=center|-
|align=center|0
|align=center|
|align=center|
|Musashimaru
|align=center|M3
|align=center|
|align=center|
|Ryōgoku
|align=center|5
|align=center|-
|align=center|10
|align=center|-
|align=center|0
|-
|align=center|6
|align=center|-
|align=center|9
|align=center|-
|align=center|0
|align=center|
|align=center|
|Kitakachidoki
|align=center|M4
|align=center|
|align=center|
|Kirinishiki
|align=center|7
|align=center|-
|align=center|8
|align=center|-
|align=center|0
|-
|align=center|8
|align=center|-
|align=center|7
|align=center|-
|align=center|0
|align=center|
|align=center|
|Akinoshima
|align=center|M5
|align=center|
|align=center|
|Misugisato
|align=center|8
|align=center|-
|align=center|7
|align=center|-
|align=center|0
|-
|align=center|7
|align=center|-
|align=center|8
|align=center|-
|align=center|0
|align=center|
|align=center|
|Kyokudōzan
|align=center|M6
|align=center|
|align=center|
|Kushimaumi
|align=center|8
|align=center|-
|align=center|7
|align=center|-
|align=center|0
|-
|align=center|4
|align=center|-
|align=center|11
|align=center|-
|align=center|0
|align=center|
|align=center|
|Mainoumi
|align=center|M7
|align=center|
|align=center|
|Sakahoko
|align=center|6
|align=center|-
|align=center|9
|align=center|-
|align=center|0
|-
|align=center|8
|align=center|-
|align=center|7
|align=center|-
|align=center|0
|align=center|
|align=center|
|Terao
|align=center|M8
|align=center|
|align=center|
|Kotogaume
|align=center|5
|align=center|-
|align=center|10
|align=center|-
|align=center|0
|-
|align=center|6
|align=center|-
|align=center|9
|align=center|-
|align=center|0
|align=center|
|align=center|
|Wakasegawa
|align=center|M9
|align=center|
|align=center|
|Kotonowaka
|align=center|7
|align=center|-
|align=center|8
|align=center|-
|align=center|0
|-
|align=center|6
|align=center|-
|align=center|9
|align=center|-
|align=center|0
|align=center|
|align=center|
|Kiraiho
|align=center|M10
|align=center|
|align=center|
|Kasugafuji
|align=center|8
|align=center|-
|align=center|7
|align=center|-
|align=center|0
|-
|align=center|10
|align=center|-
|align=center|5
|align=center|-
|align=center|0
|align=center|
|align=center|
|Takanonami
|align=center|M11
|align=center|
|align=center|
|Kotofuji
|align=center|8
|align=center|-
|align=center|7
|align=center|-
|align=center|0
|-
|align=center|8
|align=center|-
|align=center|7
|align=center|-
|align=center|0
|align=center|
|align=center|
|Tomoefuji
|align=center|M12
|align=center|
|align=center|
|Takamisugi|align=center|8
|align=center|-
|align=center|7
|align=center|-
|align=center|0
|-
|align=center|6
|align=center|-
|align=center|9
|align=center|-
|align=center|0
|align=center|
|align=center|
|Daizen
|align=center|M13
|align=center|
|align=center|
|Kototsubaki
|align=center|7
|align=center|-
|align=center|8
|align=center|-
|align=center|0
|-
|align=center|8
|align=center|-
|align=center|7
|align=center|-
|align=center|0
|align=center|
|align=center|
|Daishōhō|align=center|M14
|align=center|
|align=center|
|Tatsuhikari
|align=center|7
|align=center|-
|align=center|8
|align=center|-
|align=center|0
|-
|align=center|4
|align=center|-
|align=center|11
|align=center|-
|align=center|0
|align=center|
|align=center|
|Ōzutsu
|align=center|M15
|align=center|
|align=center|
|Wakashoyo
|align=center|6
|align=center|-
|align=center|9
|align=center|-
|align=center|0
|-
|align=center|8
|align=center|-
|align=center|7
|align=center|-
|align=center|0
|align=center|
|align=center|
|Tsunenoyama |align=center|M16
|align=center|
|align=center|
|Kotoinazuma'|align=center|8
|align=center|-
|align=center|7
|align=center|-
|align=center|0
|}

Haru basho
Osaka Prefectural Gymnasium, Osaka, 8 March – 22 March

Natsu basho
Ryōgoku Kokugikan, Tokyo,  10 May – 24 May

Nagoya basho
Aichi Prefectural Gymnasium, Nagoya, 5 July – 19 July

Aki basho
Ryōgoku Kokugikan, Tokyo, 13 September – 27 September

Kyushu basho
Fukuoka International Centre, Kyushu, 8 November – 22 November

News
JanuaryYokozuna Asahifuji retires after losing his first three bouts, leaving the injured Hokutoumi as the only yokozuna on the banzuke.Maegashira Takahanada wins his first makuuchi yusho with a 14-1 record, the youngest ever to do so. He wins all three special prizes for Technique, Outstanding Performance and Fighting Spirit. Runner-up is Akebono on 13-2, who shares the Outstanding Performance and Fighting Spirit prizes. Ozeki Konishiki, who won the previous tournament in November 1991 and is aiming for yokozuna promotion, can only manage third place with a 12-3 score. Takahanada's brother Wakahanada shares the Technique prize. Toyonoumi wins the juryo division championship. Veteran former komusubi Tamaryu retires.

February
Dewanoumi Oyakata, former yokozuna Sadanoyama, becomes the chairman of the Japan Sumo Association after Futagoyama Oyakata, the former yokozuna Wakanohana, steps down.
Former yokozuna Chiyonofuji, who retired in May 1991, has his official retirement ceremony at the Ryogoku Kokugikan.
Konishiki and his new wife, a fashion model, hold a wedding reception in Tokyo.

March
Konishiki wins his third career championship with a 13-2 record, but is not promoted to yokozuna. The chairman of the Yokozuna Deliberation Council, Hideo Ueda says, "We want to make doubly sure that Konishiki is worthy to be a grand champion. Therefore, we decided to wait for another tournament."  After this, Konishiki never won more than 10 bouts in a single tournament again.

April
Chiyonofuji becomes head coach of Kokonoe stable.
Konishiki is quoted in the New York Times as saying, "if I were Japanese, I would be there (yokozuna) already," causing an international furore.

May
Hokutoumi announces his retirement, leaving no yokozuna for the first time in over 60 years. He is the fourth yokozuna in a year to retire, following Chiyonofuji in May 1991, Onokuni in July 1991, and Asahifuji in January. 
Akebono wins the championship with a 13-2 record and is promoted to ozeki. He also receives the Outstanding Performance award. Konishiki can manage only a 9-6 record, meaning he is no longer on a  yokozuna promotion run and must start over. The runner-up is Wakahanada on 11-4, who wins his third Technique Award. Veteran Misugisato wins his first (and only) special prize in his career, for Fighting Spirit. Former  sekiwake Ozutsu and Tochitsukasa, and former komusubi Takanofuji, all retire. Another former sekiwake, Kotogaume,  wins the juryo championship. Former Nihon University champion Sakamotoyama wins the makushita division title with a perfect 7-0 record.

JulyMaegashira Mitoizumi is the surprise winner of the championship with a 13-2 record. He is the fourth maegashira-ranked yusho winner in a year, following Kotofuji in July 1991, Kotonishiki in September 1991, and Takahanada in January. He finishes two wins ahead of Musashimaru, who wins his first Technique Award, and ozeki Kirishima on 11-4. Mitoizumi also receives his sixth Fighting Spirit prize. The Outstanding Performance prize goes to Kyokudozan for defeating the two highest ranked wrestlers on the banzuke (Kirishima and Konishiki). The juryo championship goes to Wakashoyo. Former maegashira Wakasegawa retires.

September
Takahanada wins his second championship with a 14–1 record from the rank of komusubi. He also wins his fourth Outstanding Performance prize. His closest challengers are two maegashira, Kotonishiki and Daishoho, both on 11-4. Daishoho shares the Fighting Spirit prize with Kyokudozan, who gets a winning record in his komusubi debut. Kotobeppu wins the juryo championship, while 28 year old ex-teacher and amateur champion Narimatsu wins the makushita championship. Izutsu stable's Sakahoko and Sasshunada both retire.

November
Akebono wins his second championship. Kirishima loses his ozeki'' status.

See also
List of years in sumo

References

Sumo by year
Sumo